Karimganj College, established in 1946, is one of the oldest undergraduate, coeducational college situated in Karimganj, Assam. This college is affiliated with the Assam University.

Departments

The college has total 19 departments and centres covering science and mathematics, commerce and humanities.

Science 
Botany & Biotechnology
Chemistry
Computer Science
Computer Application
Ecology and Environmental Science
Geology
Mathematics
Physics
Statistics
Zoology

Commerce
Commerce

Arts
Arabic
 Bengali
Economics
 English
History
Philosophy
Political Science
Sanskrit

Karimganj College Students Union (KCSU)
The Union activities are divided into indoor and out-door sports, cultural activities, meeting and debates social service etc. Membership to the Union is compulsory. Principal is the Ex-officio President of the Union. Other office bearers and Class Representatives are elected annually from amongst the student who act under supervision of professors-in-charge of different sections. Students Union election is conducted as per the constitution of the Karimganj College students’ union adopted after DHE’s guideline No. PC/HE/ CC, 13/2006/16 dt. 18-09-2006 based on the direction of the Hon’ble Supreme Court.

References

External links
http://www.karimganjcollege.ac.in/

Universities and colleges in Assam
Colleges affiliated to Assam University
Educational institutions established in 1946
1946 establishments in India